Heat is the second album from French musician Colder, released by Output Recordings on 4 July 2005. The album was produced in Paris, France and was released on CD, limited edition CD (housed in a digipak), and limited edition red-coloured 12" vinyl. The album was also released on CD in Mexico with two bonus tracks. All versions of the album are out of print.

Track listing

Personnel
Marc Nguyen Tan – music, vocals
Gael Villeroux – guitar on "To the Music"
Norscq – mixing, premastering
Kourtney Roy – cover artwork, photos

Singles
 "Wrong Baby" (27 June 2005)
CD:
 "Wrong Baby" (Radio Edit)
 "Wrong Baby" (Dzir Such a Crush Mix)
 "Wrong Baby" (Playgroup Version 1)
 "Wrong Baby" (Original Version)
7" vinyl:
 "Wrong Baby"
 "Le Quart d'Heure" (The Grief cover)
12" vinyl:
 "Wrong Baby"
 "Wrong Baby" (Issakidis Dzir Dub)
 "Wrong Baby" (Playgroup Version 1)
 "Wrong Baby" (Playgroup Version 2)
 "To the Music" (6 February 2006)
Promo CD:
 "To the Music" (Radio Edit)
 "To the Music" (Midnight Mike Vocal Remix)
 "To the Music" (Lotterboys Remix)
 "To the Music" (Engel Remix)
 "To the Music" (Arto's Mwarmer Remix)
 "To the Music" (Original Version)
12" vinyl #1:
 "To the Music" (Original Version)
 "To the Music" (Arto's Mwarmer Version)
 "To the Music" (Midnight Mike Remix)
 "To the Music" (Midnight Mike Dub)
12" vinyl #2:
 "To the Music" (Engel Remix)
 "To the Music" (Lotterboys Remix)
 "To the Music" (Lotterboys Dub)

References

2005 albums
Colder (musician) albums